Valenciolenda is a cavernicolous monotypic genus of planthopper in the family Kinnaridae.

Etymology 
The genus is a combination of Valencia (the type locality) and the tribe Adolendini. The species name is a combination of the Valencian word for "fairy" (fada) and forest meaning "fairy of the forest".

Distribution 
Specimens of Valenciolenda have been observed in six caves in the Valencian Community in Spain.

References 

Kinnaridae
Fauna of Spain
Insects described in 2021